The Mitsubishi Fuso Aero Star (kana:三菱ふそう・エアロスター) is a heavy-duty single-decker bus produced by the Japanese manufacturer Mitsubishi Fuso. The range was available as either a public bus or a coach. Its principal competitors are the Isuzu Erga, the Nissan Diesel Space Runner RA and the Hino Blue Ribbon.

Fuso full-size city bus (1950-1976) 
MR Series (1960–1964)
B800 Series (Line)
B800, B805 (1967)
B820J (1969)

MP Series (1976-1984) 
MP107/117/517 (1976)
K-MP107/MP118/518 (1980)
P-MP118/518 (1983)

Aero Star (first series, 1984-1996) 
P-MP218/618K/M/N/P (1984)
U-MP218/618K/M/N/P (1990)
U-MP618K/Mkai (MBECS Hybrid, 1993)
U-MP628K (1993)
KC-MP217/617/627K/M/N/P (1995)

Aero Star (second series, 1996-present) 
KC-MP317/717K/M/P (1996)
KC-MP747K/M (Non-step Low-floor, 1997)
KC-MP737K/M (MBECS-III Hybrid Electric)
KL-MP35/37K/M/P (2000)
MP37JM kai (Aero Star HEV Hybrid Electric, 2004)
PJ-MP35/37JK/M/P (2004)
PKG-MP35UK/UM/UP (2007)
BJG-MP37TK/M (Aero Star Eco Hybrid)
4M50 Engine with 79*2 (158) kW Motor Equipped
PKG-MP35UK/M kai (Non-step Low-floor, 2009)
Nissan Diesel MD92TJ equipped, with Urea SCR (It requires AdBlue).
LKG-/QKG-MP35/37FK/M/P (2010)
Equipment: 6M60 engine with VGT, BlueTec and Powertard, Allison 6-speed automatic transmission as standard
Sold currently in Australia as Fuso School Bus (MP35F) and Fuso City Bus (MP37F)
QKG-MP35/38FK/M/P (2014)
Face-lifted model of MP35/37, wheel bases have extended on MP38.
2PG/2KG-MP35/38K/M/P(2017)

Between 2007 and 2011, some Aero Star has been sold as UD Trucks Space Runner A (old name: Nissan Diesel Space Runner A).

Aero Star-S 
The Aero Star-S is the rebadged UD Trucks Space Runner RA (old name: Nissan Diesel Space Runner RA). It has a double-curvature windscreen, rounded roof dome (more rounded than the 1996–present Aero Star) with a separately mounted destination blind.
PKG-AA274/ADG-AA273 (2007)

Transport electrification 
The Eco Hybrid (diesel-electric bus) is now setting new standards in practical trials in Japan. It can reduce fuel consumption by as much as 30 percent. The Mitsubishi Fuso Aero Star Eco Hybrid operates with a series hybrid drive, in which the diesel engine does not drive wheels directly but instead is used solely to drive an electrical generator to recharge lithium-ion batteries, connected to the two electric motors (with a combined output of 158 kW), which propel the vehicle. Series hybrids are efficient on vehicles like urban buses with low shares of constant or high speed within their driving profile. On trucks like the Mitsubishi Fuso Canter Eco Hybrid Daimler Trucks utilizes - opposed to buses - a parallel hybrid system with an electric Motor-generator on the transmission input shaft. This system maintains better efficiency gains at higher speeds.

Range is 300 km (almost 200 miles).

See also

Mitsubishi Fuso Truck & Bus Corporation
 List of buses

References

External links

Mitsubishi Fuso Aero Star(Japanese)
Mitsubishi Fuso MP Bus (Australia)

Aero Star
Bus chassis
Buses of Japan
Hybrid electric buses
Full-size buses
Low-floor buses
Low-entry buses
Step-entrance buses
Vehicles introduced in 1984